"Buona Sera" (sometimes titled "Buona Sera, Signorina") is a song written by Carl Sigman and Peter de Rose, and best known as performed by Louis Prima in 1956. It reached number one in the singles charts in Belgium, the Netherlands and Norway, and is ranked number 3 on the all-time best-selling singles chart in Flanders between 1954 and 2014, as compiled by Ultratop. Prima's track also reached number 25 in the UK Singles Chart in February 1958.

Ralf Bendix reached number 5 in Germany with his recording of the same song in 1958. In the same year, Dean Martin recorded the song on his This is Dean Martin! album. Acker Bilk's version reached number 7 in the UK Singles Chart in 1960.

The song was used as the theme song for the second season of the TV series, Platane, by Éric Judor in 2013.

Other notable versions
 Bad Manners, UK, 1981 (number 34 in UK Singles Chart)

References

1950 songs
Number-one singles in Belgium
Number-one singles in the Netherlands
Number-one singles in Norway
Songs with music by Peter DeRose
Songs written by Carl Sigman